Carl Theodor Setterberg, (born 30. April 1853 in Järpås socken, dead 7. April 1941 in Stockholm), was a Swedish apothecary, commerce chemist and industrialist.

He passed the apothecary exam in 1876. 1879–1891, studies at Bonn, Heidelberg and Jena, where he became PhD in 1881. Founding member of  Svenska Uppfinnareföreningen (The Swedish Inventors' Association) together with Salomon August Andrée, Gustaf de Laval, Otto Fahnehjelm and Ernst August Wiman in 1886, where he became honorary commissioner in 1936.

Publications 
 Ueber die Dastellung von Rubidium- und Cæsium-Verbindungen und über die Gewinnung der Metalle selbst (1881)
 Om några cesium- och rubidiumföreningar (1882)
 Vanadinmetallen, dess framställning och fysikaliska egenskaper (1883)

Sources 

 XXIII. Sällskapet Idun (biografier af A. Levertin) (in Swedish)
  	Svenska män och kvinnor : biografisk uppslagsbok (in Swedish)

1853 births
1941 deaths
Swedish chemists